Megalancistrus is a genus of large suckermouth armored catfishes native to South America.

Species 
There are currently two recognized species in this genus:
 Megalancistrus barrae (Steindachner, 1910)
 Megalancistrus parananus (W. K. H. Peters, 1881)

Distribution
The genus Megalancistrus are found in the Río de la Plata and São Francisco River basins.

Description
Megalancistrus species are large and spiny and generally have 10 dorsal-fin rays. The color on the sides and the abdomen is dark brown with very large spots on the head, sides, and fins or with light vermicualtions. The abdomen is completely plated in adults. The caudal fin is forked, but without filaments. Cheek odontodes, as in Acanthicus, are thin but numerous. The plates on the body are well keeled with rows of odontodes above and below the keel rows incomplete in specimens up to at least .

Ecology
Megalancistrus species are live in large rivers. These fish eat freshwater sponges and probably other invertebrates. They have been found with a lot of wood in the gut, but it appears as if this was consumed accidentally.

References

Ancistrini
Fish of South America
Fish of the Amazon basin
Fauna of Brazil
Catfish genera
Taxa named by Isaäc J. H. Isbrücker